The 1990 German motorcycle Grand Prix was the fifth round of the 1990 Grand Prix motorcycle racing season. It took place on the weekend of 25–27 May 1990 at the Nürburgring race track.

500 cc race report
Though recovering from injury, Wayne Gardner refuses to stay off the bike, and breaks his foot badly in practice. In qualifying, Wayne Rainey falls off and breaks a finger, but makes the start.

Through the first turn it’s Kevin Schwantz, Mick Doohan and Pierfrancesco Chili. Rainey is down at 6th.

After a few laps it’s Schwantz, Doohan and Chili, then a small gap to Christian Sarron, Sito Pons and Rainey. In a bizarre accident, Doohan and Chili, without touching, have simultaneous highsides. Doohan’s crash is messy, his bike riding him off the track.

Schwantz is safely away, and Rainey takes the lead in the new fight for second. Rainey leaves the group, and the fight for third is split three-ways between Mackenzie, Sarron and Pons.

500 cc classification

References

German motorcycle Grand Prix
German
Motorcycle Grand Prix
Sport in Rhineland-Palatinate